Victor Lilov (born 11 February 2004) is an American tennis player.

Lilov has a career high ATP singles ranking of World No. 819 achieved on 18 July 2022.

On the junior tour, Lilov has a career high ITF junior combined ranking of World No. 3, achieved on 3 January 2022. He reached the final of the 2021 Wimbledon Championships boys' singles, losing to Samir Banerjee in the final.

ATP Challenger and ITF Futures finals

Singles: 2 (1–1)

Doubles: 2 (2–0)

Junior Grand Slam finals

Singles: 1 (1 runner-up)

References

External links

2004 births
Living people
American male tennis players
Sportspeople from Raleigh, North Carolina
American people of Bulgarian descent
Racket sportspeople from Ontario